The Los Angeles Avenues refer to a series of 50 numbered streets in Los Angeles, California in the Northeast and Eastside regions.  They are all designated with the word "Avenue" followed by a number such as "Avenue 64."   The Avenues are located in the Los Angeles neighborhoods of Lincoln Heights, Cypress Park, Montecito Heights, Glassell Park, Highland Park, Mt. Washington and Eagle Rock. They are not related to 2nd through 13th Avenues west of Arlington Avenue in Jefferson Park and other neighborhoods in South Los Angeles. 

The Avenues street gang derives their name from these avenues.

Geography
The avenue numbers generally reflect the Los Angeles street grid beginning with Avenue 16 at the 1600 block north of 1st Street in Downtown through Avenue 67 at the 6700 block in Highland Park.  North of the Los Angeles River Pasadena Avenue and Figueroa Street assume the role of Main Street and divide house numbers on streets running east and west.  House numbers originate at 100 and increase east or west from that dividing point.  For example, 1100 West Avenue 26 is 11 blocks west of Pasadena.

In many places the Avenues do not reflect the grid or the Los Angeles' numbering and naming convention.  For example:

 Pasadena Avenue is the east-west dividing street from Avenue 16 though Avenue 38 but Avenues 16 through 25 defy the naming convention and are prefixed "North" for west of Pasadena and "South" for east of Pasadena.
 At Avenue 39 Figueroa Street takes over as the divide and, through Avenue 45, Avenues are prefixed "East"-"West" according to convention but Avenues 49 through 61 revert to the non-conventional "North"-"South" prefixes again.
 Finally the dividing line turns 90 degrees to the right onto York Boulevard dividing Avenues 62 through 67 which run due north and south, perpendicular to the lower numbered Avenues to the south.
 Avenues 44 and 45 are actually labeled both North and West in different sections
 In Eagle Rock and Highland Park Avenues 45 through 61 turn due North as they proceed west of the dividing line crossing York Boulevard which runs east and west. They effectively turn the Los Angeles street grid 90 degrees to the east.  In many places the grid collides with itself with two intersecting streets bearing the same block number.

Avenues

See also
Los Angeles streets, 1–10
Los Angeles streets, 11–40
Los Angeles streets, 41–250
Northeast Los Angeles
List of streets in Los Angeles

References

Avenues
Avenue
Los Angeles Avenues
Streets Avenues
Cypress Park, Los Angeles
Glassell Park, Los Angeles
Highland Park, Los Angeles
Lincoln Heights, Los Angeles
Mount Washington, Los Angeles